Gundoald, Gundowald, Gundovald, Gondovald, or Gombald (or ) is a Germanic given name that may refer to:
 Gundovald, an Austrasian duke (Greg. of Tours, Hist., 4:47, 5:1)
 Gundovald, a count of Meaux (Greg. of Tours, Hist., 8:18)
Gundoald, Merovingian usurper of the kingdom of Aquitaine in either 584 or 585
Gundoald, Duke of Asti (c.565–616), Bavarian nobleman of the Agilolfing family
Gundoald, Bishop of Meaux (died between 625 and 637)
Gombald, Archbishop of Bordeaux (died after 998)